Prensa Obrera (Workers' Press) is the weekly newspaper edited by the Workers' Party (PO) of Argentina. The first edition went out in the year 1982. In 2010 it reached a thousand editions. It has a circulation of 15,000 copies weekly.

References

External links 
 Archive of Workers' Press 

Weekly newspapers published in Argentina
Creative Commons-licensed works